Aarre Heinonen (July 31, 1906 Lahti – January 28, 2003 Helsinki) was a Finnish artist, teacher and professor.

References

External links 
 

1906 births
2003 deaths
20th-century Finnish painters
21st-century Finnish painters
21st-century male artists
Finnish male painters
20th-century Finnish male artists